DNA repair protein complementing XP-A cells is a protein that in humans is encoded by the XPA gene.

Function

Nucleotide excision repair (NER) is a major pathway for repairing a variety of bulky DNA damages including those introduced by UV irradiation. The XPA protein appears to play a key role in NER at sites of damage as a scaffold for other repair proteins in order to ensure that the damages are appropriately excised.  Among the repair proteins with which XPA interacts is a protein complex (including the ERCC1 protein) that is capable of incising DNA at sites of damage.

Xpa mutant individuals often show the severe clinical symptoms of xeroderma pigmentosum, a condition involving extreme sensitivity to sunlight and a high incidence of skin cancer.

Interactions 

XPA has been shown to interact with ERCC1, Replication protein A1 and XAB2.

References

Further reading

External links 
  GeneReviews/NIH/NCBI/UW entry on Xeroderma Pigmentosum